

Six ships of the Royal Navy have been named HMS Indefatigable:

  was a 64-gun third-rate ship of the line launched in 1784, razeed to a 44-gun frigate in 1795 and broken up in 1816. This was the ship popularised by C. S. Forester in the early volumes of his Hornblower series of novels.
 HMS Indefatigable was to have been a 50-gun fourth rate. She was ordered in 1832 but cancelled in 1834.
  was a 50-gun fourth rate launched in 1848, loaned as a training ship after 1865 (see ) and sold in 1914.
  was an  second class cruiser launched in 1891, renamed  in 1910, and sold in 1913.

Battle honours 
Ships named Indefatigable have earned the following battle honours:
Virginie, 1796
Droits de L'Homme, 1797
Basque Roads, 1809
Jutland, 1916
East Indies, 1945
Palembang, 1945
Okinawa, 1945
Japan, 1945

Other vessels
 
 , a merchant ship launched in 1799 for trade to the West Indies. In 1804 she served as an armed defense ship and recaptured Melcombe on  21 June 1804. 
 , British training ship

See also
 
 Indefatigable (disambiguation)

References

 Lyon, David (1993) Sailing Navy List: all the ships of the Royal Navy, built, purchased and captured, 1688-1860. (Conway Maritime Press). 
 

Royal Navy ship names